The bay hornero or pale-billed hornero (Furnarius torridus) is a species of bird in the family Furnariidae.  It is found in wooded habitats along rivers, mainly in north-eastern Peru and western Amazonas.

References

bay hornero
Birds of the Amazon Basin
Birds of the Peruvian Amazon
bay hornero
bay hornero
bay hornero
Taxonomy articles created by Polbot